Sabin Chaushev (born 8 June 1971) is a Bulgarian sports shooter. He competed in the men's 25 metre rapid fire pistol event at the 1996 Summer Olympics.

References

1971 births
Living people
Bulgarian male sport shooters
Olympic shooters of Bulgaria
Shooters at the 1996 Summer Olympics
People from Yambol
20th-century Bulgarian people